Julián de Zulueta y Amondo, 1st Marquis of Álava and 1st Viscount of Casa Blanca (8 January 1814 – 4 May 1878) was a Spanish Politician of Basque descent.

Born in Anúcita, Álava, son of Domingo Timoteo de Zulueta y de Salcedo, de Lezameta y Ugarte and wife Manuela Estefania de Amondo y Barañano and a first cousin of Andrés de Isasi, 1st Marquis of Barambio.

Career
He was a Slave Trader and Proprietor in Cuba, Regidor and Mayor (Alcalde) of Havana, Senator for life of the Kingdom of Spain, etc., and was created Grand Cross of the Order of Isabel the Catholic and the Order of Charles III and also received the titles of 1st Marquess of Álava and the previous title of 1st Viscount of Casa Blanca.  Among his many commercial and industrial activities was a very extensive part in the trans-Atlantic slave trade.

Marriage and children 
He married firstly in Havana on 1 October 1842 Francisca de los Dolores Samá y de la Mota (Trujillo, Badajoz, 4 October 1825 - 12 May 1857), daughter of Jaime Samá y Martí, a Lieutenant of Infantry of the Spanish Army of Catalan descent, and wife Josefa de la Mota y García, of Castilian descent, and had issue, including Salvador de Zulueta y Samá, 2nd Marquess of Álava, 2nd Viscount of Casa Blanca (- 21 February 1913), married to María de las Angustias Martos y Arizcún (Madrid, 12 December 1854 -), daughter of the 6th Marquesses of Iturbieta, and Spanish Politician Ernesto de Zulueta y Samá. He died in Havana in 1878.

References 

 Marrero Cruz, Eduardo. "Julian de Zulueta y Amondo: promotor del capitalismo en Cuba". La Habana: Union, 2006

1814 births
1878 deaths
Marquesses of Spain
Members of the Senate of Spain
Viscounts of Spain